Coast Mountain College (CMTN) is an accredited, publicly-funded post-secondary educational institution that serves the communities of British Columbia's northwest region. CMTN offers field schools, college access, trades, university credit, health and human services programs. The college is a member of the University of the Arctic network, and Colleges and Institutes Canada (CiCan).

History
The British Columbia Vocational School, Terrace began construction in 1965.  The school opened in September 1968, with 1968-69 enrollment reaching 295 students. An official opening was held August 11, 1970.  Northwest College was established on the site in 1975. The name was soon changed to Northwest Community College (NWCC) and was renamed Coast Mountain College on June 18, 2018.

Totem poles and traditional art which reflect the history of the surrounding territories and peoples are displayed on the college campuses and have been commissioned for groups outside the region, including organizations in the United States and China. In 1996 CMTN established the First Nations Council to facilitate direct contact with Indigenous communities.

The college connected to the Provincial Learning Network (PLNET) in 2003. In 2019 the college transitioned to BCNET's Advanced Network, completing the connection of all BC post-secondary institutions.

Campus
Coast Mountain College (CMTN) has campuses in five northwest British Columbia communities: Hazelton; Haida Gwaii; Prince Rupert; Smithers; and Terrace. Coast Mountain College (CMTN) serves seven First Nations in Northwest British Columbia: Haida, Tsimshian, Nisga'a, Haisla, Gitxsan, Wet'suwet'en, and Tahltan and acknowledges the traditional territory its campuses reside on.

Terrace
The main campus sits on 30 acres approximately 5 kilometers from downtown Terrace.  Names and signage at the college are bilingual Sm'algyax and English.  Buildings include, academic building Waap Sa'mn (House of Spruce), trades building Waap Amgam (House of Cedar), cafeteria and services building Waap Haawk (House of Birch), administration building Waap Sginiis (House of Jackpine) and the 230,000 square foot student housing building Wii Gyemsiga Siwilaawksat (Where learners are content and comfortable.)

CMTN unveiled an $18.4 million state-of-the-art renovation to their Waap Amgam (House of Cedar) trades building in September 2018.

In September 2019 Minister of Advanced Education, Skills and Training Melanie Mark, visited the Terrace campus to announce an $18.7 million in provincial funding for the construction of two new 3-storey student residences. On August 31st 2022 a totem pole was raised outside the new Wii Gyemsiga Siwilaawksat building. (Where learners are content and comfortable.) 

As of 2021 work continues on major projects at Coast Mountain College campus buildings including the top two floors of the main academic building Waap Sa'mn (House of Spruce), the library and student housing with a combined budget of $35 million.

At the south end of the campus stands Waap Galts’ap, the 6,000 square foot campus Longhouse. The Longhouse, constructed in 2006  is primarily used for student-centered and cultural activities and there are various events hosted there throughout the year.

A satellite campus in the Thornhill suburb of Terrace is located at the Northwest Trades & Employment Training Centre (NTETC).

Prince Rupert
Constructed in 2004 with a $12 million budget, the two building campus of nearly 50,000 square feet is located in downtown Prince Rupert.  The campus is home to the world-renowned Applied Coastal Ecology program.  The CMTN Prince Rupert campus doubles as a campus for the University of Northern British Columbia.  The Prince Rupert campus includes a large library, multiple seminar rooms, trades facilities, a Learning Resource Centre, student lounge, 19 classrooms, two computer labs, two science labs and the innovation lab.

Smithers
The current Smithers campus is located on second Avenue and was completed in 2011 at a cost of $17 million.  The two-level Gold LEED facility is just under 20,000 square feet and was built with wood, rock and Indigenous art to represent themes of forestry, resource management and Indigenous culture.  The Bulkley Valley Learning Centre operates from the Smithers campus.

Hazelton
The Hazelton campus was constructed in 1998 at a cost of $1.3 million, with grand opening held January 16, 1999.  The 9,000 square foot building is located at 4815 Swannell Drive serving local communities including Old Hazelton, New Hazelton, South Hazelton, Two Mile, Gitanmaax, Kispiox, Glen Vowell, Hagwilget, Gitsegukla, Gitanyow, and Kitwanga.

Haida Gwaii
Coast Mountain College's Haida Gwaii campus is located in the village of Masset.  The Masset campus moved to a dedicated space in Tahayghen School in 2013.

Organization and Administration
The Coast Mountain College Board of Governors and Educational Council determine appropriate organizational performance.  The CMTN Foundation grows and stewards resources to support the college.  The First Nations Council provides direct consultation with First Nations in the college region.

Aboriginal

Coast Mountain College (CMTN) serves the people of northwest British Columbia, in a region that includes the lands of the Haida, Tsimshian, Nisga'a, Haisla, Gitxsan, Wet'suwet'en, and Tahltan peoples. CMTN through its First Nations Council, has entered into a relationship with the Nisga'a Wilp Wilxo'oskwhl Nisga'a (“Nisga'a House of Learning”) to promote and enable resident of the Nass Valley region to obtain post-secondary education. 

In 2020, CMTN added support for Indigenous Students to combat COVID-19.  Indigenous students accessing college programs or services are supported by a team of First Nations Access Coordinators.  In February 2022, CMTN’s Freda Diesing School of Northwest Coast Art alumna, artist Kristen McKay, was the winner of a Pink Shirt Day design contest held by the First Nations Access Coordinators (FNAC), that is now being distributed across all campuses in the region.

Freda Diesing School of Northwest Coast Art

The Freda Diesing School of Northwest Coast Art focuses on traditional First Nations Pacific Northwest Coast art.  Named after the Haida artist Freda Diesing, one of the first female carvers on the modern Northwest coast, aka Kant Wuss, Skill-kew-wat & Wee-hwe-doasl, who was born in the Sadsugohilanes Clan of the Haida in British Columbia to Flossie and Frank Johnson.  Her Haida name, Skill-kew-wat, translates roughly as Magical Little Woman.  At the age of 42, she undertook woodcarving apprenticeships under artists including Robert Davidson (artist). In 2000, she was awarded an honorary doctorate from Coast Mountain College.  In 2002, she received an National Aboriginal Achievement Award and honorary doctorate from the University of Northern British Columbia.

The school was opened in the Fall of 2006 by one of Freda's students Dempsey Bob. The school focuses on carving in the Northern Style, with drawing, painting, art history and tool-making courses supporting the carving component of the school.  CMTN offers a certificate and degree program in First Nations Fine Art through the Freda Diesing School of Northwest Coast Art at the Terrace campus.  This program is the first of its kind in North America, offering accredited courses recognized by the Emily Carr University of Art and Design.  In 2021 Tahltan-Tlingit master carver, and senior advisor to the Freda Diesing School, Dempsey Bob, was one of six artists across Canada to be recognized with a 2021 Governor General's Awards in Visual and Media Arts Artistic Achievement Award.

Starting in the 2021/22 academic year, students who complete the First Nations Fine Arts Diploma with a GPA of B are eligible for acceptance into the third year of the Bachelor of Fine Arts degree program at Emily Carr University of Art and Design.

Scholarships and bursaries
The CMTN Foundation supports students through scholarships and bursaries.  The Government of Canada sponsors an Aboriginal Bursaries Search Tool that lists over 680 scholarships, bursaries, and other incentives offered by governments, universities, and industry to support Aboriginal post-secondary participation. Coast Mountain College scholarships for Aboriginal, First Nations and Métis students include: Awards for Aboriginal Women.  Coast Mountain College supports students and rewards success through their CMTN Awards, Bursaries & Scholarships program.

Programs
 Applied Coastal Ecology - The Applied Coastal Ecology (ACE) program operates the vessel Na Malsga Aks, “the story the water tells” as a floating classroom. 
 Applied Earth & Environmental Studies
 Automotive Service
 Business Administration
 Carpentry
 Cosmetology
 Criminology
 Early Childhood Care & Education
 Education Assistant
 First Nations Fine Arts
 Health Care Assistant
 Heavy Mechanical
 Millwright
 Northern Collaborative Baccalaureate Nursing (NCBNP) - Registered Nurse
 Professional Cook
 Social Service Worker
 University Credit
 Welding 
 West Coast Culinary

Notable Alumni and Faculty
Dempsey Bob, Northwest Coast woodcarver and sculptor of Tahltan and Tlingit First Nations descent
Stan Persky, Canadian writer, media commentator and instructor
Skeena Reece, Canadian First Nations Artist
Jennifer Rice, Canadian politician, Member of the Legislative Assembly of British Columbia for North Coast
George Stanley, American-born Canadian poet
Marie-Lucie Tarpent, French-born Canadian linguist and professor

See also
List of institutes and colleges in British Columbia
List of universities in British Columbia
Higher education in British Columbia
Education in Canada

References

External links
Coast Mountain College
Wilp Wilxo'oskwhl Nisga'a
 

1975 establishments in British Columbia
Educational institutions established in 1975
Terrace, British Columbia
Colleges in British Columbia